The Mud Swamp/New River Wilderness is part of Apalachicola National Forest, located in the Florida panhandle. The  refuge was established on September 28, 1984.

Mud Swamp consists of very poorly drained clay-rich soil, holding more water than nearby Bradwell Bay Wilderness. It has numerous scattered small islands. Biting insects, black bears and alligators make the swamp their home.

The New River (Florida Panhandle) passes through it and is lined with Atlantic white cedar. It enters from the north and flows through cypress and gum swamps.

References

External links
 Mud Swamp/New River Wilderness at Wildernet
 Mud Swamp/New River Wilderness - official site at Apalachicola National Forest

Protected areas of Liberty County, Florida
Wilderness areas of Florida
Apalachicola National Forest
Protected areas established in 1984
1984 establishments in Florida